Joe Henry Engle (born August 26, 1932) is an American pilot, aeronautical engineer and former NASA astronaut. He was the commander of two Space Shuttle missions including STS-2 in 1981, the program's second orbital flight. He also flew three flights in the Shuttle program's 1977 Approach and Landing Tests. Engle is one of twelve pilots who flew the North American X-15, an experimental spaceplane jointly operated by the Air Force and NASA.

As an X-15 pilot, Engle made three flights above 50 miles, thus qualifying for astronaut wings under the American convention for the boundary of space. In 1966 he was selected for NASA's fifth Astronaut Group, joining the Apollo program. He was the backup Lunar Module Pilot (LMP) for Apollo 14 and originally scheduled as LMP for Apollo 17. However, cancellation of later flights prompted NASA to select geologist-astronaut Harrison Schmitt as LMP, displacing Engle.

Engle is an experienced spaceplane operator and the last living X-15 pilot.

Biography

Personal life and education
Engle was born on August 26, 1932, in Chapman, Kansas. He attended primary and secondary schools in Chapman, Kansas, and he graduated from Dickinson County High School in 1950. Engle was active as a Boy Scout and earned the rank of First Class. He received a Bachelor of Science degree in Aeronautical Engineering from the University of Kansas in 1955, where he was a member of the Theta Tau Professional Engineering Fraternity.

He was married to the late Mary Catherine Lawrence of Mission Hills, Kansas and has two grown children and one stepchild. He is currently married to Jeanie Carter Engle of Houston, Texas. Engle's recreational interests include flying (including World War II fighter aircraft), big game hunting, backpacking, and athletics.

He was a member of the Society of Experimental Test Pilots and became a Fellow in 2009.

Flight experience

Engle received his commission in the U.S. Air Force through the Air Force Reserve Officer Training Corps at the University of Kansas. While in school he was a member of the Professional Engineering Fraternity Theta Tau, and decided to become a test pilot. While working at Cessna Aircraft during the summer, he learned how to fly from a fellow draftsman, Henry Dittmer.

Engle entered flying school in 1957, and received his pilot wings in 1958. He flew the F-100 Super Sabre with the 474th Fighter Day Squadron and the 309th Tactical Fighter Squadron at George Air Force Base, California. Chuck Yeager recommended Engle for USAF Test Pilot School, from which he graduated in 1961, and he was later assigned to the third class of the Aerospace Research Pilot School, despite his reluctance to leave "stick and rudder" flying for a space capsule.

After serving as a test pilot in the Fighter Test Group at Edwards Air Force Base, California, Engle was a test pilot in the X-15 research program at Edwards from June 1963 until his assignment to the Manned Spacecraft Center (now the Lyndon B. Johnson Space Center). Engle had applied with fellow ARPS student Charles Bassett and Michael Collins to the third NASA astronaut group, but the Air Force withdrew Engle's NASA application and instead chose him to replace Robert M. White in the X-15 program, which pleased Engle.

Engle's parents witnessed his X-15 flight of June 29, 1965, which exceeded an altitude of 50 miles (80 km) and qualified him for astronaut wings; he again exceeded 50 miles twice during his career of 16 flights. On his final X-15 mission, free flight 153 (1-61-101), which took place on October 14, 1965, he became the first of only two pilots to accomplish a sub-orbital space flight in an X-15 without the benefit of the assistance provided by the MH-96 adaptive flight control system. Despite what he later called "the best flying job in the world", Engle decided to apply again to NASA as he expected to be rotated to another Air Force assignment within a year and hoped to go to the Moon.

Engle has flown over 185 different types of aircraft (25 different fighters) during his career, logging more than 15,400 hours flight time of which 9,000 were in jet aircraft.

NASA career

Engle was one of 19 astronauts selected by NASA in April 1966. He served on the support crew for Apollo 10. Following this assignment, he was backup Lunar Module Pilot for the Apollo 14 mission.  He was due to land on the Moon as Lunar Module Pilot for Apollo 17, but was replaced by geologist Harrison Schmitt.  This was a result of pressure from the scientific community to have a scientist (geologist) explore the Moon, and not just test pilot engineers who had been given geology training.  In response to getting bumped from the mission, he said "When you think about it, the lunar missions were geology-oriented."

According to Engle, Deke Slayton asked him whether he would prefer to fly on Skylab, Apollo–Soyuz, or the Space Shuttle; Engle responded that he would prefer the Shuttle as it was an airplane.

Engle was commander of one of the two crews that flew the Space Shuttle Approach and Landing Test Flights from June through October 1977. The Space Shuttle Enterprise was carried to 25,000 feet on top of the Boeing 747 carrier aircraft, and then released for its two-minute glide flight to landing. In this series of flight tests, Engle evaluated the Orbiter handling qualities and landing characteristics, and obtained the stability and control, and performance data in the subsonic flight envelope for the Space Shuttle. He was the backup commander for STS-1, the first orbital test flight of Space Shuttle Columbia. Together with pilot Richard Truly he flew as commander on the second flight of the Space Shuttle, STS-2, becoming the last NASA rookie to command a spaceflight until Raja Chari in 2021 on SpaceX Crew-3. He was also mission commander on STS-51-I and logged over 225 hours in space.

Engle is one of two people to have flown into space on two different types of winged vehicles: the X-15 and the Space Shuttle, on STS-2 (the other person being Frederick W. Sturckow). Engle manually flew large numbers of flight-test maneuvers on the Shuttle during reentry and landing; periods of manually flown test maneuvers were interspersed with periods of computer control.

He served as deputy associate administrator for manned space flight at NASA Headquarters from March 1982 to December 1982. He retained his astronaut flight status and returned to the Johnson Space Center in January 1983. He also participated in the Challenger disaster investigation in 1986, and did other consulting work on the Shuttle well into the 1990s.

Post-NASA career 
In his last active duty military assignment, Engle was the Air National Guard assistant to the commander in chief, United States Space Command and North American Air Defense Command (NORAD), with headquarters at Peterson Air Force Base, Colorado. Joe Engle retired from NASA on November 28, 1986 and the USAF on November 30, 1986. On December 1, he was promoted to the rank of major general. In 1986 he was appointed to the Kansas Air National Guard and 1992, he was inducted into the Aerospace Walk of Honor. On July 21, 2001, Engle was enshrined at Dayton, Ohio, in the National Aviation Hall of Fame Class of 2001, along with USAF ace Robin Olds, U.S. Marine Corps ace Marion Carl, and Albert Ueltschi. In November 2001, he was inducted into the U.S. Astronaut Hall of Fame in Florida.

Awards and honors

 USAF Astronaut Badge (1964)
 Defense Distinguished Service Medal – "for outstanding achievements"
 Air Force Distinguished Service Medal (1985)
 Distinguished Flying Cross, twice (1964 and 1978) – "for outstanding achievements"
 NASA Distinguished Service Medal
 Two NASA Space Flight Medals
 NASA Exceptional Service Medal
 NASA Special Achievement Award
 USAF Outstanding Young Officer of the Year (1964)
 Kansan of the Year (1964)
 U.S. Junior Chamber of Commerce's one of the Ten Outstanding Young Men of America (1964)
 American Institute of Aeronautics and Astronautics (AIAA) Pioneer of Flight Award (1965)
 AIAA Lawrence Sperry Award for Flight Research (1966)
 Iven C. Kincheloe Prize awarded by the Society of Experimental Test Pilots (1977) – for taking part in testing the Space Shuttle Enterprise
 AIAA Haley Space Flight Award (1980)
 Dr. Robert H. Goddard Memorial Trophy
 Robert J. Collier Trophy
 Harmon International Trophy (1981)
 University of Kansas Distinguished Service Citation (1982)
 University of Kansas School of Engineering Distinguished Engineering Service Award (1982)
 General Thomas D. White USAF Space Trophy, 1981
 Aerospace Walk of Honor, Lancaster, California (1992)
 National Aviation Hall of Fame, Dayton, Ohio (2001)
 U.S. Astronaut Hall of Fame, Florida (2001)
 Award of Air Force Space and Missile Pioneers (2007)
 International Air & Space Hall of Fame (2014)

See also 
 The Astronaut Monument

References

Bibliography
 Thompson, Milton O. (1992). At The Edge Of Space: The X-15 Flight Program, Smithsonian Institution Press, Washington and London.

External links

 Astronautix biography of Joe H. Engle
 Iven C. Kincheloe Awards
 Joe Engle  at the National Aviation Hall of Fame
 Joe Engle at the Kansas Historical Society
 Former BBC space correspondent Reg Turnill interviews Joe Engle in 2008

1932 births
Living people
1981 in spaceflight
1985 in spaceflight
Canceled Apollo missions
People from Chapman, Kansas
Military personnel from Kansas
United States Air Force astronauts
University of Kansas alumni
American aerospace engineers
U.S. Air Force Test Pilot School alumni
American test pilots
Aviators from Kansas
20th-century American businesspeople
United States Astronaut Hall of Fame inductees
National Aviation Hall of Fame inductees
Harmon Trophy winners
United States Air Force generals
Recipients of the Distinguished Flying Cross (United States)
Recipients of the NASA Exceptional Service Medal
Recipients of the NASA Distinguished Service Medal
NASA people
Collier Trophy recipients
Recipients of the Defense Distinguished Service Medal
X-15 program
Space Shuttle program astronauts
People who have flown in suborbital spaceflight